Michael O'Callaghan (or similar) may refer to:

Michael O'Callaghan (Paralympian), New Zealand Paralympian who competed in athletics
Mike O'Callaghan, governor of Nevada
Mick O'Callaghan, New Zealand rugby union player
Michael O'Callaghan (politician), see History of Limerick
Michael O'Callaghan (hurler)

See also
Michael Callaghan (disambiguation)